Maamigili is inhabited within the islands of Raa Atoll in the Maldives.

The island measures 750 meters in length and 500 meters in width for 100 hectares of coral reef.

Maamigili can be reached via a 45-minute seaplane ride from the capital Malé and through the new Ifuru domestic airport,15 minutes away from the island by speed boat.

Loama Resort Maldives at Maamigili is a resort situated on the island. The resort maintains a collection of historical artifacts at Loama Museum, a nation’s heritage site with ancient baths and wells, and the Loama Art Gallery with contemporary local art.

Loama Museum

Loama Museum is the only official Museum in a Hotel in the Maldives. The young museum collection spans from the Classical to British Colonial Period. These include native artifacts, foreign objects from the Early Modern or Colonial Period (1514-1828) and British Colonial Period (1828-1965), an Ancient Bath from the Classical Period (500 BCE-1153), and mausoleums from the Medieval Islamic Period (1153-1514). The museum leads to ancient baths and a traditional house, which are located at the heritage site.

Exhibits include Chinese porcelain that arrived during the Indian Ocean trade between Southeast Asia and the Middle East. Other artifacts from the collection represent the lifestyle of these coral atolls for centuries in the Indian Ocean and include grain measures, coconut oil production methods and equipment for lace.

Vevu 

Vevu (Dhivehi) or bathing tanks, were used as public baths and later for ablution. The actual period of this Vevu is unknown, however, sandstone used in construction is evidence pointing to the pre-Islamic period (500 BCE-1153 CE). The symmetry of the two wells also suggests it may have been part of a temple. These types of baths are found in other parts of Maldives. Coral stone is also seen in some of the baths and mosques. This supports the theory that the Vevu was built earlier than most coral stone mosques.

Vevu are constructed by layering sandstone blocks approximately a meter below the water line till about half a meter above the ground. There is an octagonal ledge cantilevered at low tide level for people to access the well.
According to recorded history, Maamigili has been uninhabited for at least 200 years and during this time the Vevu has been damaged by natural and human interference, yet still, it is considered a fine example of a pre-Islamic coral stone structure.

Traditional house

As part of the museum exhibit, Loama Museum features a traditional Maldivian house on the resort. The house featured follows the traditions of South Asian architectural designs. According to oral history the house has existed in Kandholhudhoo for more than 125 years. The house is built with teak panels and coral stone walls. The teak panels make up the facade and the interior dividing wall of the house. Measuring approximately 20 feet by 12 feet, the house is furnished with functional pieces used for general living.

Loama Art Gallery

Loama Art Gallery is affiliated with the National Art Gallery, Maldives, and shows contemporary art from the Maldives. It offers a platform for artists to exhibit and sell their work to local and international audiences. Contemporary art in Maldives has seen significant changes in themes and style over the last few decades.

As the only commercial art gallery in Maldives, it exhibits the works of famous artists of the Maldives along with the works of artists who are starting their career.

See also
 National Museum (Maldives)
 History of the Maldives
 Culture of the Maldives
 Islam in the Maldives
 Buddhism in the Maldives

External links
 Loama Resort Maldives at Maamigili
 Maldives National Art Gallery

References

Atolls of the Maldives